Kochergino is a rural locality (a village) in Malyshevskoye Rural Settlement, Selivanovsky District, Vladimir Oblast, Russia. The population was 299 as of 2010. There are 4 streets.

Geography 
Kochergino is located 37 km southwest of Krasnaya Gorbatka (the district's administrative centre) by road. Maryevka is the nearest rural locality.

References 

Rural localities in Selivanovsky District